Orueta is a surname. Notable people with the surname include:

Alfonso Orueta (1929–2012), Chilean politician and football manager
Arrate Orueta (born 1984), Spanish footballer
 (1808–1851), Spanish politician

See also
Oreta, a genus of moths